After a tumultuous five-year existence, the National Association of Professional Base Ball Players (NA) folded following the 1875 season. The National League of Professional Base Ball Clubs (NL) was formed in Chicago, Illinois, by businessman and owner of the Chicago Base Ball Club (now known as the Chicago Cubs), William Hulbert, for the purpose of replacing the NA, which he believed to have been corrupt, mismanaged, full of rowdy, drunken ballplayers, and under the influence of the gambling community. One of the new rules put into place by the new league was that all teams had to be located in cities that had a population of 75,000 or more. The initial NL season began with eight teams, and they were asked to play seventy games between April 22 and October 21. The NL is considered to be the first "major league", although it has been argued that the NA can make that claim.

Champions
 National League: Chicago Base Ball Club
 Champions of the West: St. Louis Base Ball Association (Unofficial postseason)

Major league baseball final standings

Statistical leaders

Events

Transactions

Free agents
 Chicago White Stockings signed Cap Anson as a free agent.
 Hartford Dark Blues signed Candy Cummings as a free agent.
 Boston Red Caps signed George Wright as a free agent.

Loans
August 10, 1876 – The New York Mutuals loaned Nealy Phelps to the Philadelphia Athletics. Phelps returned to the Mutuals on the same day.

Births

Deaths

See also
 Bryce's Base Ball Guide

References
General
 Ginsburg, Daniel E. (2004). The Fix Is in: A History of Baseball Gambling and Game Fixing Scandals. McFarland. .
 Reiss, Steven A. (2006) Encyclopedia of Major League Baseball Clubs, Volume 1. Greenwood Publishing Group. .
Specific

External links

 1876 season at Baseball-Reference.com
 Charlton's Baseball Chronology at BaseballLibrary.com
 Year by Year History at Baseball-Almanac.com
 Retrosheet.org